Dissanayake Mudiyanselage Anura Kumara Dissanayake  (born 24 November 1968) is a Sri Lankan politician who is currently serving as the leader of Janatha Vimukthi Peramuna and a member of the Parliament of Sri Lanka. He served for a time as Cabinet Minister of Agriculture, Livestock, Lands and Irrigation. Dissanayake was named the leader of JVP at the 7th national convention of the party, held on 2 February 2014. He was in the Parliament since September 2000.

Career 
He served as the Minister of Agriculture, Livestock, Land and Irrigation in the 2004 SLFP, Janatha Vimukthi Peramuna joint government under President Chandrika Kumaratunge.

2019 Presidential Election 
On 18 August 2019, the National People's Power Movement announced that Dissanayake would be its 2019 Presidential Candidate.

Electoral history

References

External links
Parliament profile

|-

1968 births
Candidates in the 2019 Sri Lankan presidential election
Government ministers of Sri Lanka
Janatha Vimukthi Peramuna politicians
National People's Power politicians
Living people
Members of the 12th Parliament of Sri Lanka
Members of the 13th Parliament of Sri Lanka
Members of the 14th Parliament of Sri Lanka
Members of the 15th Parliament of Sri Lanka
Members of the 16th Parliament of Sri Lanka
Sri Lankan Buddhists
United People's Freedom Alliance politicians
Candidates in the 2022 Sri Lankan presidential election